Simon Skelton is an English international lawn and indoor bowler.

Bowls career
Simon bowls for the Nottingham indoor club and Stute outdoor bowls club. During the 2002 Commonwealth Games he was part of the fours that won the gold medal with John Ottaway, Robert Newman and David Holt.

In 2011 he won the mixed pairs title at the 2011 World Indoor Bowls Championship with Alison Merrien and four years later won the open pairs title with Robert Paxton.

In addition to his international achievements he also won a National Championship title in 2009 representing Derbyshire and Stute BC.

He reached the final of the open singles at the 2019 World Indoor Bowls Championship as a qualifier but lost to Stewart Anderson in the final. In November 2022, he finished runner-up in the Scottish International Open, losing in the final to Stewart Anderson.

References

English male bowls players
Living people
1972 births
Commonwealth Games medallists in lawn bowls
Commonwealth Games gold medallists for England
Indoor Bowls World Champions
Bowls players at the 2002 Commonwealth Games
Bowls European Champions
Medallists at the 2002 Commonwealth Games